Phillipsburg is a town located along the Delaware River that is the most populous municipality in Warren County, New Jersey. As of the 2020 United States census, the town's population was 15,249, an increase of 299 (+2.0%) from the 2010 census count of 14,950, which in turn reflected a decline of 216 (−1.4%) from the 15,166 counted in the 2000 census.

The Norfolk Southern Railway's Lehigh Line, formerly the mainline of the Lehigh Valley Railroad with a mix of mainline trackage combined long leased to the Central Railroad of New Jersey by its builder Lehigh Coal & Navigation Company, runs through Phillipsburg and then across the Delaware River into Easton, Pennsylvania. The Belvidere Delaware Railroad was leased in 1871 and later acquired by the Pennsylvania Railroad, connecting the lower Poconos to Trenton, New Jersey and Philadelphia.

History
The town grew from a sleepy agricultural village (in 1824), and was transformed into a transportation hub and shipping center as the Delaware River terminus of the Morris Canal (1829–1924), with operations commencing in 1831. the first transportation infrastructure project (of several, each eventually) giving the community a direct connection  to New York City. The Central Railroad of New Jersey would soon follow with a connection, but the community's growth (and for a long while, its importance) was that it reached the canal terminals of both the Delaware Canal and the Lehigh Canal by its cross-river cable ferry system to Easton, Pennsylvania. In 1853, the Lehigh Valley Railroad connected across the river with the CNJ and a passenger short line railroad, the Belvidere Delaware Railroad, as well as the Morris Canal, all within Phillipsburg. Rapid growth followed quickly.

Phillipsburg was incorporated as a town by an act of the New Jersey Legislature on March 8, 1861, from portions of Phillipsburg Township (now Lopatcong Township). The town was named for William Phillips, an early settler of the area.

Geography
According to the U.S. Census Bureau, the town had a total area of 3.31 square miles (8.58 km2), including 3.19 square miles (8.26 km2) of land and 0.12 square miles (0.31 km2) of water (3.66%).

Unincorporated communities, localities and place names located partially or completely within the town include Andover Furnace, Delaware Park, Lopatcong Heights, Shirmers and Warren Heights.

Phillipsburg borders the municipalities of Lopatcong Township and Pohatcong Township in Warren County; and both Easton, Pennsylvania and Williams Township across the Delaware River in Northampton County, Pennsylvania.

Climate

Demographics

The Town's economic data (as is all of Warren County) is calculated by the United States Census Bureau as part of the Allentown-Bethlehem-Easton, PA-NJ Metropolitan Statistical Area.

2010 census

The Census Bureau's 2006–2010 American Community Survey showed that (in 2010 inflation-adjusted dollars) median household income was $42,825 (with a margin of error of +/− $3,386) and the median family income was $51,334 (+/− $3,243). Males had a median income of $44,311 (+/− $2,090) versus $37,673 (+/− $6,847) for females. The per capita income for the borough was $21,291 (+/− $1,061). About 16.5% of families and 18.5% of the population were below the poverty line, including 31.1% of those under age 18 and 6.5% of those age 65 or over.

Economy

Industrial history
Phillipsburg had historically benefited from being a major transportation hub, then manufacturing with the investments by Ingersoll Rand in 1903 by opening the first Ingersoll-Sergeant factory in Phillipsburg. Within a year it employed 1,000 people, reaching a peak of 5,000. Phillipsburg is being reinvented once again as a tourist attraction based on Eco-Tourism. The town is situated at the confluence of the Delaware and Lehigh rivers. Phillipsburg served as the western terminus of the Morris Canal for approximately 100 years from the 1830s to 1920s, which connected the city by water to the industrial and consumer centers of the New York City area, with connections westward via the Lehigh Canal and Delaware Canal across the Delaware. Long gone is the era of canal shipping and many of the important freight railways that served the area have gone bankrupt or bypass the city on long-distance routes.

Phillipsburg was served by five major railroads: 
 Central Railroad of New Jersey (CNJ) 
 Lehigh & Hudson River Railroad (L&HR) 
 Lehigh Valley Railroad (LVRR)
 Delaware, Lackawanna & Western Phillipsburg Branch (DL&W) 
 Pennsylvania Railroad Belvidere Division (PRR)

Economic revival
A majority of the manufacturing jobs left Warren County's largest city once Ingersoll Rand closed operations in 2000.

Portions of the town are part of an Urban Enterprise Zone (UEZ), one of 32 zones covering 37 municipalities statewide. The city was selected in 1994 as one of a group of 10 zones added to participate in the program. In addition to other benefits to encourage employment within the UEZ, shoppers can take advantage of a reduced 3.3125% sales tax rate (half of the % rate charged statewide) at eligible merchants. Established in November 1994, the town's Urban Enterprise Zone status expires in October 2025.

Businesses have begun to move on to South Main Street, including the opening of the Apothecarium Dispensary – Phillipsburg in November 2019 
selling marijuana, the Town Council voted in June 2021 to adopt an ordinance preventing the opening of any other cannabis retailers.

Railway
A tourist railroad known as the Belvidere & Delaware River Railroad operates on the former Belvidere-Delaware Railroad Pennsylvania Railroad Branch serving excursions from Lehigh Junction Station south to Carpentersville. Norfolk Southern serves the industrial manufacturing purposes in Phillipsburg using former LVRR tracks and the L&HR bridge to connect with the Bel-Del PRR tracks.

Since 2007, NJ Transit has been conducting a study to determine if re-establishing a commuter rail extension of the Raritan Valley Line to Phillipsburg is economically feasible.

Phillipsburg also is home to the Phillipsburg Railroad Historians museum. They display railroad memorabilia inside the museum, an "N" scale diorama, two Lehigh & Hudson River cabooses (one of which is currently being restored), and a Jersey Central caboose. There is an L&HR snow flanger, Tidewater tank car, a CNJ box car owned by the Anthracite Railroads Historical Society, a 1922 Chestnut Ridge Mack railbus owned by the Lehigh Valley NRHS, a Public Service trolley owned by the North Jersey Electric Railway Historical Society, a 44-ton GE locomotive and a 25-ton GE locomotive. They operate a miniature railroad, the Centerville & Southwestern, that formerly ran in Roseland, New Jersey.

Government

Local government
Phillipsburg is governed under the Mayor-Council system of municipal government within the Faulkner Act, formally known as the Optional Municipal Charter Law. The town is one of 71 municipalities (of the 564) statewide that use this form of government. The governing body is comprised of the Mayor and the five-member Town Council. Councilmembers are elected at-large in partisan elections to four-year terms of office on a staggered basis, with either three seats or two seats and the mayoral seat up for election in odd-numbered years as part of the November general election.

, the Mayor of Phillipsburg is Republican Todd M. Tersigni, whose term of office ends December 31, 2023. Members of the Town Council are Council President Harry L. Wyant (R, 2023), Council Vice President Lee M. Clark (D, 2025), Keith A. Kennedy (D, 2025), Peter Marino (R, 2025) and Randy S. Piazza Jr. (R, 2023).

In 2018, the town had an average property tax bill of $4,387, the lowest in the county, compared to an average bill of $6,982 in Warren County and $8,767 statewide.

Mayors of Phillipsburg

Federal, state and county representation
Phillipsburg is located in the 7th Congressional District and is part of New Jersey's 23rd state legislative district.

Politics
As of March 2011, there were a total of 7,681 registered voters in Phillipsburg, of which 2,496 (32.5% vs. 21.5% countywide) were registered as Democrats, 1,510 (19.7% vs. 35.3%) were registered as Republicans and 3,665 (47.7% vs. 43.1%) were registered as Unaffiliated. There were 10 voters registered as Libertarians or Greens. Among the town's 2010 Census population, 51.4% (vs. 62.3% in Warren County) were registered to vote, including 69.2% of those ages 18 and over (vs. 81.5% countywide).

In the 2012 presidential election, Democrat Barack Obama received 2,487 votes (56.6% vs. 40.8% countywide), ahead of Republican Mitt Romney with 1,751 votes (39.8% vs. 56.0%) and other candidates with 88 votes (2.0% vs. 1.7%), among the 4,394 ballots cast by the town's 7,730 registered voters, for a turnout of 56.8% (vs. 66.7% in Warren County). In the 2008 presidential election, Democrat Barack Obama received 2,673 votes (54.8% vs. 41.4% countywide), ahead of Republican John McCain with 1,983 votes (40.6% vs. 55.2%) and other candidates with 116 votes (2.4% vs. 1.6%), among the 4,879 ballots cast by the town's 7,636 registered voters, for a turnout of 63.9% (vs. 73.4% in Warren County). In the 2004 presidential election, Democrat John Kerry received 2,412 votes (49.8% vs. 37.2% countywide), ahead of Republican George W. Bush with 2,324 votes (48.0% vs. 61.0%) and other candidates with 66 votes (1.4% vs. 1.3%), among the 4,842 ballots cast by the town's 7,176 registered voters, for a turnout of 67.5% (vs. 76.3% in the whole county).

In the 2013 gubernatorial election, Republican Chris Christie received 63.8% of the vote (1,667 cast), ahead of Democrat Barbara Buono with 33.6% (879 votes), and other candidates with 2.6% (68 votes), among the 2,694 ballots cast by the town's 7,909 registered voters (80 ballots were spoiled), for a turnout of 34.1%. In the 2009 gubernatorial election, Republican Chris Christie received 1,321 votes (44.1% vs. 61.3% countywide), ahead of Democrat Jon Corzine with 1,159 votes (38.7% vs. 25.7%), Independent Chris Daggett with 365 votes (12.2% vs. 9.8%) and other candidates with 77 votes (2.6% vs. 1.5%), among the 2,994 ballots cast by the town's 7,437 registered voters, yielding a 40.3% turnout (vs. 49.6% in the county).

Education
The Phillipsburg School District serves public school students from pre-kindergarten through twelfth grade The district is one of 31 former Abbott districts statewide that were established pursuant to the decision by the New Jersey Supreme Court in Abbott v. Burke which are now referred to as "SDA Districts" based on the requirement for the state to cover all costs for school building and renovation projects in these districts under the supervision of the New Jersey Schools Development Authority.

As of the 2020–21 school year, the district, comprised of five schools, had an enrollment of 3,877 students and 329.0 classroom teachers (on an FTE basis), for a student–teacher ratio of 11.8:1. Schools in the district (with 2020–21 enrollment data from the National Center for Education Statistics) are 
Early Childhood Learning Center with 354 students in grades Pre-K–K, 
Phillipsburg Primary School with 391 students in grades 1–2, 
Phillipsburg Elementary School with 609 students in grades 3–5, 
Phillipsburg Middle School with 704 students in grades 6–8 and 
Phillipsburg High School with 1,730 students in grades 9–12. The Phillipsburg High School Stateliners have a longstanding athletic rivalry with neighboring Easton, Pennsylvania's Easton Area High School, which celebrated its 100th anniversary game on Thanksgiving Day 2006. In 2009, the 1993 teams from the Easton P-Burg Game met again for the Gatorade REPLAY Game to resolve the game, which ended in a 7–7 tie, with more than 13,000 fans watching as Phillipsburg won by a score of 27–12.

The district's high school serves students from the Town of Phillipsburg and five sending communities at the secondary level: Alpha, Bloomsbury (in Hunterdon County), Greenwich Township, Lopatcong Township and Pohatcong Township, as part of sending/receiving relationships with the respective school districts.

Students from the town and all of Warren County are eligible to attend Ridge and Valley Charter School in Frelinghuysen Township (for grades K–8) or Warren County Technical School in Washington borough (for 9–12), with special education services provided by local districts supplemented throughout the county by the Warren County Special Services School District in Oxford Township (for PreK–12).

Private schools include Saints Philip & James School, which was established in 1875 and serves students in pre-kindergarten through eighth grade, operating under the auspices of the Roman Catholic Diocese of Metuchen.

Transportation

History
Situated at the confluence of the Delaware River and the Lehigh River, Phillipsburg has historically been a major transportation hub. From the 1830s to 1920s, was the western terminus of the Morris Canal, which connected it by water eastward to the Port of New York and New Jersey and westward via the Lehigh Canal across the Delaware River. Five major railroads converged in Phillipsburg, the Central Railroad of New Jersey (CNJ), the DL&W's Morris and Essex Railroad, the Lehigh & Hudson River Railroad (L&HR), Lehigh Valley Railroad (LVRR), and the Pennsylvania Railroad's (PRR) Belvidere Delaware Railroad. The CNJ first ran in 1852. Phillipsburg Union Station served CNJ and DL&W.

The CNJ tracks and bridge in Phillipsburg which was part of the CNJ mainline became part of the former Lehigh Valley Railroad mainline, the Lehigh Line now owned by Norfolk Southern Railway, while the PRR line in Phillipsburg is now the Belvidere and Delaware River Railway.

Roads and highways

Major highways that pass through Phillipsburg include U.S. Route 22 and Route 122. Interstate 78 passes through for less than a  without any exits. The closest interchange is in neighboring Pohatcong.

The town is connected to Pennsylvania across the Delaware River by three bridges: the Easton–Phillipsburg Toll Bridge – (toll bridge carrying U.S. Route 22), the Northampton Street Bridge (the "Free Bridge") and the Interstate 78 Toll Bridge (carrying Interstate 78), all of which are operated by the Delaware River Joint Toll Bridge Commission.

Public transportation
NJ Transit bus service is provided on the 890 and 891 routes. It is also served by a bus line down Route 57 to Washington Township.

Air transportation

Notable people

People who were born in, residents of, or otherwise closely associated with Phillipsburg include:

 Walter E. Bachman (1880–1958), college football player and coach
 Charlie Berry (1860–1940), former professional baseball player, Union Association, and father of Charlie Berry
 Charlie Berry (1902–1972), former professional baseball player and umpire, Major League Baseball
 William F. Birch (1870–1946), former Member of Congress
 Ned Bolcar (born 1967), former linebacker who played for the Seattle Seahawks and Miami Dolphins
 Tom Brennan (born 1949), radio and television sportscaster and former men's basketball head coach, most notably at the University of Vermont
 Tim Brewster (born 1960), former coach of the Minnesota Golden Gophers football team
 Harold Curry (1932–2022), lawyer and politician who served in the New Jersey General Assembly
 Ted Dailey (1908–1992), NFL player who played for a single season with the Pittsburgh Pirates football team
 D. C. Drake (born 1957 as Don Drake), former professional wrestler who was National Wrestling Federation World Champion and Heavyweight Champion for Tri-State Wrestling Alliance, later known as Extreme Championship Wrestling (ECW)
 Wayne Dumont (1914–1992), former New Jersey Senate Majority Leader and Senate President
 Fiona (born 1961), rock music singer-songwriter and actress
 James Cullen Ganey (1899–1972), federal judge who served on the United States Court of Appeals for the Third Circuit
 Dan Gray (born 1956), former NFL defensive tackle who played for the Detroit Lions in 1978
 John R. Guthrie (1921–2009), United States Army four-star general
 David Hajdu (born 1955), music critic and author
 Terry Kitchen, folk singer
 Frederick Kroesen (1923–2020), United States Army officer
 J. Robert Lennon (born 1970), novelist
 Hilda Madsen (1910–1981), British-American artist and dog breeder
 Jayne Mansfield (1933–1967), 1950s-era actress
 Martin O. May (1922–1945), Medal of Honor recipient in World War II for his actions on Okinawa
 Olivia Miles (born 2003), college basketball player for the Notre Dame Fighting Irish women's basketball team.
 Helen Stevenson Meyner (1929–1997), politician who served in Congress from 1975 to 1979
 Robert B. Meyner (1908–1990), Governor of New Jersey from 1954 to 1962
 Charles E. Myers (1925–2016), Director for Air Warfare in the Office of the Secretary of Defense (1973–1978), Aviation Pioneer and an early member of the "Fighter Mafia" inside the Pentagon
 Lou Reda (born –2017), documentary filmmaker
 Jim Ringo (1931–2007), professional football player who played in the NFL for the Green Bay Packers and Philadelphia Eagles
 Sheetal Sheth (born 1976), actress
 Charles Sitgreaves (1803–1878), politician who was a Member of Congress and mayor of Phillipsburg
 Matthew Tirrell (born 1950), chemical engineer
 Bill Walsh (1927–2012), center who played in the NFL for the Pittsburgh Steelers
 Christina Wilson (born 1979), chef and reality television personality who was the winner of season 10 of the FOX Network's reality cooking show Hell's Kitchen
 Yvonne Zima (born 1989), actress who appeared on NBC's ER

References

External links

 Phillipsburg official Web Site
 Phillipsburg Area Chamber Of Commerce
 

 
1861 establishments in New Jersey
Faulkner Act (mayor–council)
New Jersey Urban Enterprise Zones
Populated places established in 1861
Towns in Warren County, New Jersey
New Jersey populated places on the Delaware River